Zhangixalus dorsoviridis, also known as  the green-back treefrog, is a species of frog in the family Rhacophoridae that is found in northern Vietnam and southern China (Yunnan). It may be confused with Rhacophorus nigropunctatus. Its natural habitats are subtropical or tropical moist montane forests, freshwater marshes, and intermittent freshwater marshes. It is threatened by habitat loss.

References

dorsoviridis
Frogs of China
Amphibians of Vietnam
Amphibians described in 1937
Taxa named by René Léon Bourret
Taxonomy articles created by Polbot